The Allegri Quartet is a string quartet that was founded in 1953 by Eli Goren and William Pleeth.

It is Britain's longest-running chamber music ensemble, sustained over six decades by successive generations of performers. 

A commitment to refreshing the repertoire had led the Allegri Quartet to give more than 60 world premières since 1964, including specially commissioned pieces by leading composers such as James MacMillan, Jonathan Harvey and Colin Matthews.

Personnel 
The quartet's members have included:

1st Violin
 Eli Goren (founder)
 Hugh Maguire
 Peter Carter
 Daniel Rowland
 Ofer Falk
 Martyn Jackson

2nd Violin
 James Barton
 Peter Thomas
 David Roth
 Fiona McNaught
 Rafael Todes

Viola
 Patrick Ireland
 Prunella Pacey
 Keith Lovell
 Roger Tapping
 Jonathan Barritt
 Dorothea Vogel

Cello
 William Pleeth
 Bruno Schrecker
 Pal Banda
 Katherine Jenkinson
 Vanessa Lucas-Smith

The names of the current performers are shown in emboldened text.  Like all the senior professional String Quartets, the members of the Allegri teach and give masterclasses as well as performing and recording. 

The Quartet celebrated their 50th anniversary in 2004 and held a reunion at the Llanfyllin Festival at which many of the past members also performed.

Daniel Rowland joined the Quartet following Peter Carter's retirement at the beginning of 2005.

External links
 Allegri Quartet - Official Website
 'The Allegri at 50 – a Quartet in Five Movements' by Piers Burton-Page
 Allegri Quartet on MySpace
 Allegri Quartet on YouTube
 Allegri Quartet Archive

Musical groups established in 1953
English string quartets